Sven Erik Svedman (born 13 October 1946) is a Norwegian diplomat and politician for the Conservative Party.

He is a siv.øk. by education, and started working for the Norwegian Ministry of Foreign Affairs in 1973. From 1989 to 1990, he served as a State Secretary in the Ministry of Foreign Affairs as a part of the Syse's Cabinet. He was then minister and deputy ambassador at the Norwegian embassy in the United States from 1990 to 1994, and Norwegian ambassador to Israel from 1994 to 1997. After a period as deputy under-secretary of state in the Ministry of Foreign Affairs, he served as ambassador to France from 2003 to 2005. He was then permanent under-secretary of state in the Ministry of Foreign Affairs from 2005 to 2007, and Norwegian ambassador to Germany from 2007 to 2014. Leaving the position at Chief Economist at the Norwegian Ministry of Foreign Affairs, he was appointed as President of the EFTA Surveillance Authority for the period 1 September 2015 to 31 December 2017.

References

1946 births
Living people
Norwegian civil servants
Ambassadors of Norway to the United States
Ambassadors of Norway to Israel
Ambassadors of Norway to France
Ambassadors of Norway to Germany
Conservative Party (Norway) politicians
Norwegian state secretaries
Recipients of the Order of the Cross of Terra Mariana, 2nd Class
Grand Crosses with Star and Sash of the Order of Merit of the Federal Republic of Germany